The Allen Parish Courthouse in Oberlin, Louisiana is the courthouse of Allen Parish, Louisiana which was built in 1912.  It was listed on the National Register of Historic Places in 1981.

It is a tall two-story brick building set on "an English basement", with architecture in "a robust style which was inspired by the Classical Baroque". Its second floor has four sets of double Ionic columns setting off three arch windows that illuminate the courtroom inside.  The courthouse dominates Oberlin, commanding it from its position at the end of an avenue and from its tall height relative to one-story commercial buildings of the town. It has been the seat of parish government since its construction.

References

See also

 National Register of Historic Places listings in Allen Parish, Louisiana

Courthouses on the National Register of Historic Places in Louisiana
Neoclassical architecture in Louisiana
Government buildings completed in 1912
Allen Parish, Louisiana